Cho Byeong-kyu (born April 23, 1996) is a South Korean actor. He is best known for his roles in the television series SKY Castle (2018–2019), Hot Stove League (2019–2020), and The Uncanny Counter (2020–2021).

Personal life

Bullying allegations and investigation
 
In February 2021, Cho Byeong-kyu was accused of being a former bully back in his school days, which led to a suspension of his career and investigations being made on the veracity of these allegations. In July 2021, police investigations had concluded that the allegations were fabricated and the accuser had apologised to Cho, who was set to recover his career and in talks to star in a new drama serial.

Filmography

Film

Television series

Web series

Television show

Awards and nominations

References

External links
 
 
 
 Daum Fancafe (Byeong-kyu joined)

1996 births
Living people
Male actors from Seoul
South Korean male film actors
South Korean male stage actors
South Korean male television actors
21st-century South Korean male actors
Seoul Institute of the Arts alumni
Best New Actor for SBS Drama Awards winners